General elections were held in Malta between 13 and 16 October 1880. The majority of elected Councillors were members of the Anti-Reform Party.

Background
The elections were held under the 1849 constitution, which provided for an 18-member Government Council, of which ten members would be appointed and eight elected.

Results
A total of 2,400 people were registered to vote, of which 1,866 cast votes, giving a turnout of 78%.

References

1880
1880 elections in Europe
1880 in Malta
October 1880 events